Jean-Gaspard Heilmann ( 1718 – 27 September 1760) was an 18th-century French  painter, author of popular landscapes, historical scenes and fine portraits. He was the first Mulhouse painter who enjoyed a certain notoriety in Paris.

Biography 
Born in Mulhouse, from a Mulhouse family documented since the 16th century, an orphan at a very young age, he was formed in Schaffhausen by the painter Hans Deggeller, then at Basel (Switzerland).

Noticed by the cardinal of Tencin, he followed him to Rome and executed many commissions for him. The French Ambassador to Rome took him to Paris in 1742. Heilmann lived there until his death and connected with the engraver Jean-Georges Wille and François Boucher, first painter of king Louis XV.

He died in Paris in 1760 at the age of 42.

Selected works 
Portrait de femme (oil), 1748, Musée Magnin in Dijon
Portrait d'homme et son pendant Portrait de femme (1749), Musée des Beaux-Arts de Strasbourg
Sous-bois (drawing), Musée Bonnat in Bayonne
Autoportrait en costume d'atelier (oil), Musée des beaux-arts de Mulhouse
Autoportrait en costume d'apparat (oil), c. 1750, Musée des beaux-arts de Mulhouse
Deux natures mortes, Musée des beaux-arts de Mulhouse

References

Bibliography 
Johann Kaspar Füssli, Histoire des meilleurs peintres de la Suisse, Zurich, 1755-1756, vol. 3, 
Ernest Meininger, Les anciens artistes-peintres et décorateurs mulhousiens jusqu'au XIXe siècle. Matériaux pour servir à l'histoire de l'art à Mulhouse, 1908, reissued at Nabu Press in 2010 ; full original text online , numerous biographical references
, article by Raymond Oberlé, issue No 16,

External links 

 Louis-Gabriel Michaud, Biographie universelle ancienne et moderne : histoire par ordre alphabétique de la vie publique et privée de tous les hommes, vol. 19, Desplaces, Paris, 1843-18..., p. 49
 J. Caspar Heilmann (18th century engraving in intaglio, on the website of the Institut national d'histoire de l'art)
 
 Louis-Gabriel Michaud, Biographie universelle ancienne et moderne : histoire par ordre alphabétique de la vie publique et privée de tous les hommes, Desplaces, Paris, 1843-18..., p. 49
 Œuvres dans les collections des musées d'art et d'histoire de la ville de Genève

18th-century French painters
French landscape painters
French portrait painters
French history painters
Artists from Mulhouse
1710s births
1760 deaths